The Yakovlev Yak-6 was a Soviet twin-engined utility aircraft, developed and built during World War II. It was used as a short-range light night bomber and a light transport.

Development
In April 1942, the Yakovlev design bureau was instructed to design a twin-engined utility transport aircraft to supplement smaller single-engined aircraft such as the Polikarpov U-2. The design was required to be simple to build and operate. Design and construction work proceeded extremely quickly, with the first prototype Yak-6 flying in June 1942. It passed its state acceptance tests in September that year and was quickly cleared for production.

The Yak-6 was a cantilever low-wing monoplane of all-wood construction with fabric covering. It had a retractable tailwheel undercarriage, with the main wheels retracting rearwards into the engine nacelles. The horizontal tail was braced. It was powered by two 140 hp Shvetsov M-11F radial engines driving two-bladed wooden propellers, with the engine installation based on Yakovlev's UT-2 primary training aircraft. In order to minimise the use of scarce resources, the aircraft's fuel tanks were made of chemical-impregnated plywood rather than metal or rubber. Many Yak-6s were fitted with fixed landing gear.

The aircraft appeared in two versions, one as a transport and utility aircraft for the supply of partisans, transport of the wounded, and for liaison and courier services.  It could accommodate two crew side-by-side in an enclosed cockpit with capacity to carry four passengers or 500 kg (1,100 lb) or cargo. The second version was a light night bomber (designated NBB - nochnoy blizhniy bombardirovshchik - Short Range Night Bomber), capable of carrying up to 500 kg of bombs on racks under the wing centre sections and with a defensive armament of a single ShKAS machine gun in a dorsal mounting. A total of 381 examples were built with production ending in 1943.

A few examples of an improved version of the Yak-6 with swept outer wings were flown, with the modified version sometimes known as the Yak-6M. The Yak-6M led to the larger Yak-8 which flew in early 1944.

Operational history
The Yak-6 was used with great effect at the front lines in the Great Patriotic War both as a transport and as a bomber, proving popular with its crews, although the potential for the aircraft to enter a spin if overloaded or carelessly handled resulting in production ending in 1943 in favour of the similarly powered Shcherbakov Shche-2. By 1944, most operational units of the VVS had a Yak-6 as a utility aircraft. In the Battle for Berlin, the Yak-6 was fitted with rocket launchers under the wings for ten 82-mm RS-82 missiles for use against ground targets. After the end of the Second World War, some Yak-6s were supplied to allies, while it remained in large scale service with Soviet forces until 1950.

Variants
 Yak-6 : Twin-engined light utility transport aircraft.
 NBB : Short-range night bomber aircraft.
 Yak-6M : Improved version of the Yak-6.

Operators

Normandie-Niemen squadron transport plane

Soviet Air Force

Mongolian People's Army Air Force - Transports units

Specifications (Yak-6 (1943 production))

See also

References

External links

 https://web.archive.org/web/20130430162446/http://www.aviation.ru/Yak/#6

1940s Soviet military utility aircraft
Yak-006
World War II Soviet aircraft
Low-wing aircraft
Aircraft first flown in 1942
Twin piston-engined tractor aircraft